KK Navico Akademija FMP  is a Macedonian basketball club based in Skopje, North Macedonia.

History
Founded in 2013, KK Navico Akademija FMP had their first senior team in the 2014–15 season. KK Navico Akademija FMP finished the season second  in the Macedonian Third League, a position which allowed them to promote to the Macedonian Second League.

In 2019, the team finished the regular season of Macedonian Second League as the undefeated club in both groups. In the playoffs, they lost in the finals against the MZT Skopje 2.

However, the team won the additional playoff match against the lowest-ranked team in Macedonian First League, Shkupi. KK Navico Akademija FMP was promoted to the Macedonian First League.

The team has been part of the Macedonian First League since the 2019–2020 season. On October 12, 2019, KK Navico Akademija FMP began its journey in the first league with a loss against Gostivar. On November 9, 2019, KK Navico Akademija FMP won against Rabotnički.

In the season 2020/2021 KK Navico Akademija FMP played in the playoffs in Macedonian First League, finishing eighth in the regular season. Also the team qualified in the semi finals of Macedonian Basketball Cup 2021.

Honors 
Macedonian First League

 Qualified for the playoffs: season 2020/2021

Macedonian Cup

 Qualified in the semifinals: 2021

Macedonian Second League
 Runners-Up: 2019 (promoted)
		
Macedonian Third League
 Runners-Up - 2015 (promoted)

BIBL League Seasons 
2022:(2-6) 9th

Current squad

>

Depth chart

References

External links
Official Website
Team info at EuroBasket
Team info at RealGM